Rajkumar College may refer to:

Rajkumar College, Raipur
Rajkumar College, Rajkot